José María Linares is a province in the eastern parts of the Bolivian department of Potosí. Its capital is Puna.

Location
José María Linares province is one of sixteen provinces in the Potosí Department. It is located between 19° 30' and 20° 16' South and between 64° 43' and 65° 53' West. It borders Cornelio Saavedra Province in the north, Tomás Frías Province in the northwest, Antonio Quijarro Province in the west, Nor Chichas Province in the south, and Chuquisaca Department in the east. The province extends over 120 km from east to west and 85 km from north to south.

Geography
The Potosí mountain range traverses the province. Other mountains are listed below:

Division
The province comprises three municipalities which are further subdivided into cantons.

Until August 15, 2006, when Ckochas Municipality was created, its three cantons, Turuchipa, Duraznos and Esquiri, belonged to the Puna Municipality.

Population
The main language of the province is Quechua, spoken by 80%, while 44% of the population speak Spanish. The population dropped from 52,535 inhabitants (1992 census) to 50,899 (2001 census), a decrease of 2.1%. 

90% of the population have no access to electricity, 89% have no sanitary facilities. 69% of the population are employed in agriculture, 0.5% in mining, 11% in industry, 20% in general services. 88% of the population are Catholics, 10% Protestants.

The people are predominantly indigenous citizens of Quechua descent.

See also
 Ch'aki Qucha
 Jatun Mayu
 T'ala Qucha
 T'uruchipa River

References

External links
 National Institute of Statistics of Bolivia

 

Provinces of Potosí Department